Carosello Records is an Italian record label.

References

Italian record labels